Acroloxidae, commonly known as river limpets, are a taxonomic family of very small, freshwater snails, aquatic pulmonate gastropod limpet-like mollusks with a simple flattened conical shell in the clade Hygrophila.

Acroloxidae is the only family within the superfamily Acroloxoidea (according to the taxonomy of the Gastropoda by Bouchet & Rocroi, 2005).

Distribution 
Worldwide.

Anatomy 
Pulmones are reduced. Sexual cavity and accessory gills are on the right side.

Genera
Genera within the family Acroloxidae include:
 Acroloxus Beck, 1838 - type genus
 Ancylastrum Bourguignat, 1853
 Baicalancylus Starobogatov, 1967
 Gerstfeldtiancylus Starobogatov, 1989
 Pseudancylastrum Lindholm, 1909

References
This article incorporates public domain text from the reference.

External links 

 
Taxa named by Johannes Thiele (zoologist)